Laois County Council is the authority responsible for local government in County Laois, Ireland. As a county council, it is governed by the Local Government Act 2001. The council is responsible for housing and community, roads and transportation, urban planning and development, amenity and culture, and environment. The council has 19 elected members. Elections are held every five years and are by single transferable vote. The head of the council has the title of Cathaoirleach (Chairperson). The county administration is headed by a Chief Executive, John Mulholland. The county town is Portlaoise.

History
Originally meetings of Laois County Council were held in Portlaoise Courthouse. After the courthouse became inadequate, a purpose-built facility, known as County Hall was built in May 1982.

Local Electoral Areas and Municipal Districts
Laois County Council is divided into the following municipal districts and local electoral areas, defined by electoral divisions.

Councillors

2019 seats summary

Councillors by electoral area
This list reflects the order in which councillors were elected on 24 May 2019.

Notes

Co-options

See also
Local Government (Ireland) Act 1898
Local government in the Republic of Ireland

References

External links

Politics of County Laois
County councils in the Republic of Ireland